The 1862 Michigan gubernatorial election was held on November 4, 1862. Incumbent Republican Austin Blair defeated Democratic nominee Byron G. Stout with 52.53% of the vote.

General election

Candidates
Major party candidates
Austin Blair, Republican
Byron G. Stout, Democratic

Results

References

1862
Michigan
Gubernatorial
November 1862 events